The Apple A13 Bionic is a 64-bit ARM-based system on a chip (SoC), designed by Apple Inc. It appears in the iPhone 11, 11 Pro/Pro Max, the 9th generation iPad,  the iPhone SE (2nd generation) and the Studio Display. Apple states that the two high performance cores are 20% faster with 30% lower power consumption than the Apple A12's, and the four high efficiency cores are 20% faster with 40% lower power consumption than the A12's.

Design
The Apple A13 Bionic features an Apple-designed 64-bit six-core CPU implementing ARMv8.4-A ISA, with two high-performance cores running at 2.65 GHz called Lightning and four energy-efficient cores called Thunder. The Lightning cores feature machine learning accelerators called AMX blocks. Apple claims the AMX blocks are six times faster at matrix multiplication than the Apple A12's Vortex cores. The AMX blocks are capable of up to one trillion single-precision operations per second.

The A13 integrates an Apple-designed four-core graphics processing unit (GPU) with 20% faster graphics performance and 40% lower power consumption than the A12's. Apple claims their A13's eight-core Neural Engine dedicated neural network hardware is 20% faster and consumes 15% lower power than the A12's.

It is manufactured by TSMC on their 2nd generation 7 nm N7P (not to be confused with '7 nm+' or 'N7+'), and contains 8.5 billion transistors.

The A13 has video codec encoding support for HEVC and H.264. It has decoding support for HEVC, H.264, MPEG‑4 Part 2, and Motion JPEG.

Products that include the Apple A13 Bionic
 iPhone 11
 iPhone 11 Pro & 11 Pro Max
 iPhone SE (2nd generation)
 iPad (9th generation)
 Apple Studio Display

Gallery

See also
 Apple silicon, the range of ARM-based processors designed by Apple
Apple M1
Comparison of Armv8-A processors

References

Computer-related introductions in 2019
Apple silicon